Evan C. Currie (born June 3, 1976) is a Canadian writer of space opera, military science fiction and techno-thriller novels. His books have been translated into Polish and German.

Currie has a post-secondary education in computer sciences and has worked in the local lobster industry steadily over the last decade.

Works

Odyssey One series
Main series:
 Into the Black (2011)
 The Heart of Matter (2012)
 Homeworld (2013)
 Out of the Black (2014)
 Warrior King (2016)
 Odysseus Awakening (2017)
 Odysseus Ascendant (2018)
 King's Fall (2022)

Star Rogue Tie in series
 King of Thieves (2015)

Archangel One Tie in series
 Archangel One (2019)
 Archangel Rising (2020)
 Imperial Gambit (2022)

Holy Ground Tie in series (prologue)
 Holy Ground (2021)

The Scourwind Legacy series
 Heirs of Empire (2015)
 An Empire Asunder (2016)

Hayden War series
 On Silver Wings (2011)
 Valkyrie Rising (2011)
 Valkyrie Burning (2012)
 The Valhalla Call (2013)
 By Other Means (2014)
 De Opresso Liber (2016)
 Open Arms (2017)
 Border Wars (2019)
 Among Enemies (2021)

Atlantis Rising series
 Knighthood (2017)
 The Demon City (2018)
 Risen (2021)

Superhuman series
 Superhuman (2018)
 Superhuman: Countdown to Apocalypse (2018)
 Superhuman: Semper Fi (2019)
 Heroic: The Golden Age (2021)

Imperium of Terra series
 I Was Legion (2020)
 Legion In Exile (2022)

Other
 Thermals (2011)
 Steam Legion (2012)
 SEAL Team 13 (2013)

References

External links

Living people
Canadian science fiction writers
Canadian male novelists
1979 births
21st-century Canadian novelists
21st-century Canadian male writers